Alta California ('Upper California'), also known as Nueva California ('New California') among other names, was a province of New Spain formally established in 1804. Following the Mexican War of Independence, it became a territory of Mexico in April 1822 and was renamed  in 1824.

The territory included all of the U.S. states of California, Nevada, and Utah, and parts of Arizona, Wyoming, and Colorado. That change was undone in 1846, but rendered moot by the outcome of the Mexican–American War in 1848, when most of the areas formerly comprising Alta California were ceded to the U.S. in the treaty which ended the war. In 1850, California joined the union as the 31st state.

The El Camino Real trail established by the Spanish extended from Mexico City west to Santa Fe, and California, as well as east to Florida. To the southeast, beyond the deserts and the Colorado River, lay the Spanish settlements in Arizona. Spanish soldiers, settlers, and missionaries invaded the homelands of the Indigenous peoples of California, people of the Great Basin, and the Pueblo peoples in the establishment of Alta California.

Evidence of Alta California remains in the numerous Spanish place names of American cities such as San Diego, Santa Ana, Los Angeles, San Jose, San Francisco, and San Bernardino.

History

Plans for colonization (1697–1769)

Father Eusebio Kino missionized the Pimería Alta from 1687 until his death in 1711. In 1697, a Jesuit expansion into California was funded and the Misión de Nuestra Señora de Loreto Conchó was established that same year. Plans in 1715 by Juan Manuel de Oliván Rebolledo resulted in a 1716 decree for extension of the conquest (of Baja California) which came to nothing. Juan Bautista de Anssa proposed an expedition from Sonora in 1737 and the Council of the Indies planned settlements in 1744, although these plans did not take action.

Don Fernando Sánchez Salvador researched the earlier proposals and suggested the area of the Gila and Colorado Rivers as the locale for forts or presidios preventing the French or the English from "occupying Monterey and invading the neighboring coasts of California which are at the mouth of the Carmel River." Alta California was not easily accessible from New Spain: land routes were cut off by deserts and Indigenous peoples who were hostile to invasion. Sea routes ran counter to the southerly currents of the distant northwestern Pacific. Ultimately, New Spain did not have the economic resources nor population to settle such a far northern outpost.

Spanish interest in colonizing Alta California was revived under the visita of José de Gálvez as part of his plans to completely reorganize the governance of the Interior Provinces and push Spanish settlement further north. In subsequent decades, news of Russian colonization and maritime fur trading in Alaska, and the 1768 naval expedition of Pyotr Krenitsyn and Mikhail Levashev alarmed the Spanish government and served to justify Gálvez's vision.

Spanish colonization (1769–1821)

The Portolá expedition was the first European land-entry expedition into the area that is now California. The missionaries and soldiers encountered numerous Indigenous peoples of the area, who became the primary subjects of the expanding Jesuit and Franciscan missions that were already established in Baja California and Baja California Sur. The expedition first established the Presidio of San Diego at the site of the Kumeyaay village of Kosa'aay, which became the first European settlement in the present state of California. At first contact, the villagers provided food and water for the expedition, who were suffering from scurvy and water deprivation.

The first Alta California mission was founded that same year adjacent to the village Mission San Diego de Alcalá, founded by the Franciscan friar Junípero Serra and Gaspar de Portolá in San Diego in 1769. Similar to the site of this mission, subsequent missions and presidios were often founded at the site of Indigenous villages. Mission San Gabriel Arcángel was founded at the Tongva village Toviscanga and the Pueblo de Los Ángeles at the village of Yaanga. The first settlers of Los Angeles were African and mulatto Catholics, including at least ten of the recently re-discovered Los Pobladores. Mission San Juan Capistrano was founded at the Acjachemen village of Acjacheme. Mission San Fernando was founded at Achooykomenga.

As the Spanish and civilian settlers further intruded into Indigenous lands and imposed their practices, ideas of property, and religion onto them backed by the force of soldiers and settlers, Indigenous peoples formed rebellions on Spanish missions and settlements. A major rebellion at Mission San Gabriel in 1785 was led by the medicine woman Toypurina. Runaways from the missions were common, where abuse, malnourishment, and overworking were common features of daily life. Runaways would sometimes find shelter at more distant villages, such as a group of runaways who found refuge at the Vanyume village of Wá’peat, the chief of which refused to give them up. Many children died young at the missions. One missionary reported that 3 of every 4 children born at Mission San Gabriel died before reaching the age of two.

The precolonial Indigenous population of California is estimated to have numbered around 340,000 people, who were diverse culturally and linguistically. From 1769-1832, at least 87,787 baptisms and 63,789 deaths of Indigenous peoples occurred, demonstrating the immense death rate at the missions in Alta California. Conversion to Christianity at the colonial missions was often resisted by Indigenous peoples in Alta California. Many missionaries in the province wrote of their frustrations with teaching Indigenous people to internalize Catholic scripture and practice. Many Indigenous people learned to navigate religious expectations at the missions with complex social behaviors in order to maintain their cultural and religious practices.

Establishment of ranchos
In 1784, the Spanish established the first rancho, Rancho San Pedro, as a 48,000 acre site for cattle grazing. Nine ranchos were subsequently established before 1800. Spanish, and later Mexican, governments rewarded retired soldados de cuera with large land grants, known as ranchos, for the raising of cattle and sheep. Hides and tallow from the livestock were the primary exports of California until the mid-19th century. Similar to the missions, the construction, ranching and domestic work on these vast estates was primarily done by Indigenous peoples, who learned to speak Spanish and ride horses. Under Spanish and Mexican rule, the ranchos prospered and grew. Rancheros (cattle ranchers) and pobladores (townspeople) evolved into the unique Californio culture.
By law, mission land and property were to pass to the Indigenous population after a period of about ten years, when the Indigenous people would become Spanish subjects. In the interim period, the Franciscans were to act as mission administrators who held the land in trust for the Indigenous residents. The Franciscans, however, prolonged their control over the missions even after control of Alta California passed from Spain to independent Mexico, and continued to run the missions until they were secularized, beginning in 1833. The transfer of property never occurred under the Franciscans.

As the number of Spanish settlers grew in Alta California, the boundaries and natural resources of the mission properties became disputed. Conflicts between the Crown and the Church arose over land. State and ecclesiastical bureaucrats debated over authority of the missions. The Franciscan priests of Mission Santa Clara de Asís sent a petition to the governor in 1782 which stated that the Mission Indians owned both the land and cattle and represented the Ohlone against the Spanish settlers in nearby San José. The priests reported that Indians' crops were being damaged by the pueblo settlers' livestock and that the settlers' livestock was also "getting mixed up with the livestock belonging to the Indians from the mission" causing losses. They advocated that the Indigenous people be allowed to own property and have the right to defend it.

Province of Alta California
In 1804, due to the growth of the Spanish population in new northern settlements, the province of Las Californias was divided just south of San Diego, following mission president Francisco Palóu's division between the Dominican and Franciscan jurisdictions. Governor Diego de Borica is credited with defining Alta (upper) and Baja (lower) California's official borders.

The cortes (legislature) of New Spain issued a decree in 1813 for at least partial secularization that affected all missions in America and was to apply to all outposts that had operated for ten years or more; however, the decree was never enforced in California. 

The Adams–Onís Treaty of 1819, between the United States and Spain, established the northern limit of Alta California at latitude 42°N, which remains the boundary between the states of California, Nevada and Utah (to the south) and Oregon and Idaho (to the north) to this day. Mexico won independence in 1821, and Alta California became a territory of Mexico the next year.

Independent Mexico (1821–1846)

Mexico gained independence from Spain on August 24, 1821, upon conclusion of the decade-long Mexican War of Independence. As the successor state to the Viceroyalty of New Spain, Mexico automatically included the provinces of Alta California and Baja California as territories. Alta California declared allegiance to the new Mexican nation and elected a representative to be sent to Mexico City. On November 9, 1822, the first legislature of California was created. With the establishment of a republican government in 1824, Alta California, like many northern territories, was not recognized as one of the constituent States of Mexico because of its small population. The 1824 Constitution of Mexico refers to Alta California as a "territory".

Secularization of the missions (1833)
Resentment was increasing toward appointed territorial governors sent from Mexico City, who came with little knowledge of local conditions and concerns. Laws were imposed by the central government without much consideration of local conditions, such as the Mexican secularization act of 1833, causing friction between governors and the people.

In 1836, Mexico repealed the 1824 federalist constitution and adopted a more centralist political organization (under the "Seven Laws") that reunited Alta and Baja California in a single California Department. The change, however, had little practical effect in far-off Alta California. The capital of Alta California remained Monterey, as it had been since the 1769 Portola expedition first established a military/civil government, and the local political structures were unchanged.

The friction came to a head in 1836, when Monterey-born Juan Bautista Alvarado led a revolt against the 1836 constitution, seizing control of Monterey from Nicolás Gutiérrez. Alvarado's actions nearly led to a civil war with loyalist forces based in Los Angeles, but a ceasefire was arranged. After an unsettled period, Alvarado agreed to support the 1839 constitution, and Mexico City appointed him to serve as governor from 1837 to 1842. Other Californio governors followed, including Carlos Antonio Carrillo, and Pío Pico. The last non-Californian governor, Manuel Micheltorena, was driven out after another rebellion in 1845. Micheltorena was replaced by Pío Pico, last Mexican governor of California, who served until 1846 when the U.S. military occupation began.

Mexican–American War (1846–1848)

In the final decades of Mexican rule, American and European immigrants arrived and settled in the former Alta California. Those in Southern California mainly settled in and around the established coastal settlements and tended to intermarry with the Californios. In Northern California, they mainly formed new settlements further inland, especially in the Sacramento Valley, and these immigrants focused on fur-trapping and farming and kept apart from the Californios.
In 1846, following reports of the annexation of Texas to the United States, American settlers in inland Northern California took up arms, captured the Mexican garrison town of Sonoma, and declared independence there as the California Republic. At the same time, the United States and Mexico had gone to war, and forces of the United States Navy entered into Alta California and took possession of the northern port cities of Monterey and San Francisco. The forces of the California Republic, upon encountering the United States Navy and, from them, learning of the state of war between Mexico and the United States, abandoned their independence and proceeded to assist the United States forces in securing the remainder of Alta California. The California Republic was never recognized by any nation and existed for less than one month, but its flag (the "Bear Flag") survives as the flag of the State of California.

After the United States Navy's seizure of the cities of southern California, the Californios formed irregular units, which were victorious in the Siege of Los Angeles, and after the arrival of the United States Army, fought in the Battle of San Pasqual and the Battle of Domínguez Rancho. But the Californios were defeated in subsequent encounters, the battles of Río San Gabriel and La Mesa. The southern Californios formally surrendered with the signing of the Treaty of Cahuenga on January 13, 1847. After twenty-seven years as part of independent Mexico, California was ceded to the United States in 1848 with the signing of the Treaty of Guadalupe Hidalgo. The United States paid Mexico $15 million for the lands ceded.

Governors
 1804 – 25 July 1814 José Joaquín de Arrillaga
 25 July 1814 – 15 August 1815 José Darío Argüello (acting)
 15 August 1815 – 11 April 1822 Pablo Vicente de Solá

For Mexican governors see List of governors of California before 1850

Flags that have flown over California

For even more Californian flags see:

Historic population figures

Population statistics of Alta California Province
The data in this table includes California, Nevada, Utah and parts of Arizona, Colorado and Wyoming.

Regions (1850 census)

In popular culture
 In the second half of the 19th century, there was a San Francisco-based newspaper called The Daily Alta California (or The Alta Californian). Mark Twain's first widely successful book, The Innocents Abroad, was an edited collection of letters written for this publication.
 In the 1998 film The Mask of Zorro, fictional former Governor Don Rafael Montero plans to purchase the area from Mexico to set up an independent republic, roughly corresponding to historical Alta California.
 The Carl Barks comic book Donald Duck in Old California! provided a glimpse into the lives of the Californios.

See also
 History of California through 1899
 Territorial evolution of California
 Landing of the first Filipinos

Notes

References

Footnotes

Citations

Further reading
 Album of Views of the Missions of California, Souvenir Publishing Company, San Francisco, Los Angeles, 1890s.
Beebe, Rose Marie (2001). Lands of Promise and Despair: Chronicles of Early California, 1535–1846. Berkeley: Heyday Books. 
 Blomquist, L.R., A Regional Study of the Changes in Life and Institutions in the San Luis Obispo District, 1830–1850 (M.A. thesis, History Department, University of California, Berkeley, 1943). Source consulted by Ryan & Breschini (2010).
 Breschini, G.S., T. Haversat, and R.P. Hampson, A Cultural Resources Overview of the Coast and Coast-Valley Study Areas [California] (Coyote Press, Salinas, CA, 1983). Source consulted by Ryan & Breschini (2010).
 California Mission Sketches by Henry Miller, 1856 and Finding Aid to the Documents relating to Missions of the Californias : typescript, 1768–1802 at the Bancroft Library
Fink, Augusta (1972). Monterey, The Presence of the Past. San Francisco, CA: Chronicle Books. 
 
Milliken, Randall (1995). A Time of Little Choice: The Disintegration of Tribal Culture in the San Francisco Bay Area 1769–1910. Menlo Park, CA: Ballena Press Publication. 
 The Missions of California, by Eugene Leslie Smyth, Chicago: Alexander Belford & Co., 1899.

External links
Worldstatesmen.org: Provinces of New Spain
Alta California grants in UC Library System Calisphere
Mexican Land Grants of Santa Clara County at the University of California, Berkeley, Earth Sciences & Map Library 
 POPULATION IN ALTA CALIFORNIA:1790-1830. CALIFORNIA STATE UNIVERSITY, NORTHRIDGE

 

 
New Spain
Former Spanish colonies
Former states of Mexico
Independent Mexico
1804 in Alta California
1804 establishments in Alta California
1804 establishments in New Spain
States and territories established in 1804
1846 disestablishments in Alta California
States and territories disestablished in 1846
Former territorial entities in North America
Spanish-speaking countries and territories